is a Japanese former professional baseball pitcher. As a player, Yoshimi spent his entire 15-year carrier in Nippon Professional Baseball (NPB) with the Chunichi Dragons.

Early career
Yoshimi started playing baseball in Grade 2 of elementary school. At high school, Yoshimi was the ace for Konkō Ōsaka High School and took his team to the second round of the 2002 Japanese High School Baseball Invitational Tournament.

After graduating high school, Yoshimi joined Toyota's corporate baseball team where he was regarded as one of the best players in industrial league baseball. During this time, he underwent surgery on his elbow which reduced the hype surrounding him.

Professional career

On September 10, 2006, Yoshimi was registered for the first-team for the first time and debuted against the Hiroshima Toyo Carp with an untarnished 1.1 innings. On September 18, Yoshimi would claim his first win, this time against the Yokohama DeNA Baystars where he pitching 5 innings for 2 earned runs. In the 2006 Japan Series he was used in relief.

In 2007, Yoshimi was named MVP of the Japanese Farm Team National Championships and would later take part in the Dominican Winter League where he would pitch for Estrellas Orientales.

On November 1, 2020, Yoshimi announced his retirement. On November 5, 2020, he held press conference.

References

External links

1984 births
Living people
Baseball people from Kyoto
Chunichi Dragons players
Estrellas Orientales players
Japanese expatriate baseball players in the Dominican Republic
Japanese baseball players
Nippon Professional Baseball pitchers